Saundersia is a genus of epiphytic orchids endemic to Brazil.
It contains two species accepted as of June 2014:

Saundersia mirabilis Rchb.f., Bot. Congr. Lond.: 120 (1866).
Saundersia paniculata Brade, Arq. Serv. Florest. 1(2): 1 (1941).

References

 
Oncidiinae genera
Endemic orchids of Brazil
Epiphytic orchids